Man ska leva för varandra is a song written by Bengt Sundström, and recorded by Trio me' Bumba, releasing it as a single in September 1968, and charted at Svensktoppen for 26 weeks between 26 May-16 November 1969, which included the song topping the chart

A Jan Sparring recording from his 1981 album Jan Sparring sjunger country charted at Svensktoppen for two weeks between 12–19 April 1981, peaking at 9th position.

The song was later recorded by Berth Idoffs in 1986.

References 

1968 singles
Swedish-language songs
Swedish songs
Berth Idoffs songs
Trio me' Bumba songs
1968 songs